Gérald Guennelon (born 22 June 1967) is a French former ice hockey defenceman. He competed in the men's tournaments at the 1992 Winter Olympics and the 1994 Winter Olympics.

References

External links

1967 births
Living people
Brûleurs de Loups players
Chamonix HC players
Gothiques d'Amiens players
Ice hockey players at the 1992 Winter Olympics
Ice hockey players at the 1994 Winter Olympics
Olympic ice hockey players of France
People from Chamonix
Sportspeople from Haute-Savoie
Hockey Club de Reims players